The Rivian R1S is an all-electric full-size off-road SUV manufactured by Rivian Automotive. Customer deliveries started in 2022. The car took nearly 10 years to develop. Depending on the configuration, it has either two or four electric motors.

Design
 It is designed to hold seven passengers and accelerate from 0 to 60 mph (0 to 97 km/h) in 3 seconds, due to its  combined output power. It shares 91% of its components with the Rivian R1T. Rivian's flat, low center of gravity chassis makes it an "electric vehicle skateboard". The vehicle is equipped for semi-autonomous driving according to level 3 and designed for road traffic and off-road driving.

Powertrain
As announced in 2018, the R1S was planned to be offered with three different traction battery capacities and power outputs; all planned versions included four traction motors. Each wheel is driven by an independent traction motor, allowing full-time all-wheel drive with torque vectoring. The quad-motor version uses electric traction motors developed by Robert Bosch GmbH, but these are carried on the vehicle's frame; the R1S does not use wheel hub motors like the Lordstown Endurance.

Rivian has announced plans to reduce prices by offering dual-motor versions starting in 2024, with independent traction motors for the front and rear axles, using motors developed by Rivian. Dual-motor versions are expected to offer the same choice of three different battery capacities, with slightly greater corresponding range as the weight and efficiency should improve with two motors. Maximum output of the dual-motor version is expected to be > and >, which is a decrease from the quad-motor version.

The extended range ("Max Pack") battery has been delayed until 2023. In addition, the smaller ("Standard") battery is not scheduled to be delivered until 2024; the Standard battery will use lithium iron phosphate (LFP) chemistry to reduce costs by eliminating nickel and cobalt.

Consumption and performance

Storage and towing

Total enclosed cargo volume is  when the second and third rows are folded down. There is a front trunk (aka "frunk") is under the hood, where the engine is in most conventional internal combustion engine vehicles, which adds  of lockable storage. In addition, there is a small compartment underneath the cargo floor.

Interior
Pet comfort mode maintains a user-selected temperature inside the car when the driver is away from the vehicle. A five-passenger option deleting the third row was discontinued in March 2022 before production vehicles began to be delivered; all R1Ss are seven-passenger, three-row vehicles. Third-row seating was reported to be "a little tight for adults", with low cushion height resulting in most people adopting a posture with knees higher than their hips.

The glass roof is not equipped with a sunshade and the resulting insolation made Motor Trend reviewers uncomfortable during comparison testing in the desert at temperatures exceeding . The same reviewers criticized the infotainment system, which is not equipped with Apple CarPlay or Android Auto.

Chassis
In addition, there is a "Camp Mode" that allows the vehicle to level itself when parked on irregular terrain.

Compared to the R1T, which has a  wheelbase, the R1S rides on a shorter  wheelbase and has a shorter rear overhang, improving departure and breakover angles. This also results in a turning circle that is nearly  smaller for the R1S.

Trim levels
The entry-level trim was called the Explore package, which included matte-black interior finishes and heated vegan leather seats. In August 2022, Rivian announced it had discontinued the Explore package citing low demand, simplified assembly and supply chain constraints that would be alleviated with a single option. By eliminating the base trim, Rivian effectively increased prices.

The Adventure package upgrades the interior with heated and cooled perforated vegan leather seats, Chilewich woven floor mats, wood or vegan leather accents, and a premium Rivian Elevation sound system designed by Meridian Audio which includes a removable Bluetooth speaker.

The limited-availability Launch edition included the Adventure package, the large battery, an exclusive Launch green color, and an option to upgrade wheels and tires at no additional cost.

History

The Rivian R1S debuted as a prototype model first shown at the Los Angeles Auto Show in November 2018. The prototype shown in LA was said to be in "production form". By December 2019, Rivian had raised $1.3 billion in new funding for this and the R1T Truck.

Delivery delays
The first two R1S vehicles were delivered to the CEO, R.J. Scaringe, and the CFO, Claire McDonough, in December 2021. Rivian announced in mid-June 2022 that there would be a delay for some deliveries of its R1S electric SUV. The company cites the delay is due to supply chain issues and limited service infrastructure. Deliveries to customers began in late August 2022. The first vehicles to be released were equipped with the large (135 kW/hr) battery and quad-motor drivetrain.

Price changes 
In March 2022, Rivian announced the price of the R1S would increase by 20%, jumping to $84,500 from $70,000 for the base model. After receiving negative feedback, Rivian honored the original prices for pre-orders made before the price increase. In August 2022, Rivian cancelled the base Explore trim level, forcing people who pre-ordered the Explore to either cancel or upgrade to the more expensive Adventure trim.

Competition
 GMC Hummer EV

References

External links

 

Rivian vehicles
Production electric cars
Rivian SUVs
Sport utility vehicles
Full-size sport utility vehicles